On 25 March 2021, Venice celebrated the 1,600th anniversary of its founding.

The foundation of Venice 
The foundation of Venice is generally considered borne witness to by a manuscript by Chronicon Altinate and, in a more recent era, by Marin Sanudo, who described the massive fire of the Rialto bridge in 1514, stating that: "Solum restò in piedi la chiexia di San Giacomo di Rialto, la qual fu la prima chiexia edificata in Venetia dil 421 a dì 25 Marzo, come in le nostre croniche si leze".

In an Italy hard hit by the COVID-19 pandemic with a total absence of tourists, with travel blocks both in European nations and Italian regions, the city of Venice celebrates the 1600th anniversary of its foundation  with a program of events organized and promoted by local bodies and institutions, which will include exhibitions, museum and city tours, conferences and seminars.

La Fenice 

On April 26, 2021, the La Fenice theater in Venice reopened to the public, after being stopped due COVID-19 pandemic, albeit with a few and distant audience, with a concert by Giuseppe Verdi. All 250 seats available in the Gallery were sold out in a very short time.

Venice Biennale

Venice Biennale of Architecture

Venice Film Festival

Venetian Arsenal 

G20 Finance Ministers and Central Bank Governors Meeting and side events.
From 8 to 11 July 2021.

G20 Finance Ministers and Central Bank Governors (FMCBG) will meet for the 3rdtime under the Italian G20 Presidency on Friday 9 and Saturday 10 July 2021 in Venice.
From Thursday 8 to Sunday 11 July, within  the  context  of  the  G20  FMCBG  Venice  Meeting, a number of side events will also be held at the Venetian  Arsenal.
These  include  the G20-OECD Global Forum on Productivity, the G20 International Tax Symposium and the International Conference on Climate.

The feast of the Redeemer 

The Feast of the Redeemer is scheduled for July 17, 2021, the religious festival established in memory of the end of the plague pandemic that hit Venice between 1575 and 1577 is accompanied by a fireworks display of particular beauty.

The decree law to protect Venice 

On 1 August 2021, large ships will no longer be able to transit in front of San Marco and on the Giudecca canal. This was established by the decree law approved on the afternoon of 13 July 2021 by the Council of Ministers. Compensation is foreseen for companies that will be harmed by this decision. Cruise ships will be able to temporarily dock in Marghera. The decree law, approved by the Council of Ministers, provides for the prohibition of navigation in Venice and in the maritime routes defined as being of cultural interest.

The navigation ban is envisaged for ships with at least one of these characteristics: - more than 25,000 gross tonnage; - more than 180 meters in length; - more than 35 meters high - production of more than 0.1% of sulfur. A guarantee fund is foreseen to a contribution to related companies and workers. Ships that do not have the aforementioned four characteristics, and which are therefore considered sustainable, will be able to continue to dock (these are cruise ships with around 200 passengers). The decree will enter into force the day after its publication in the Gazzetta Ufficiale.

See also 
 History of the Republic of Venice
 Timeline of Venice
 Rialto Bridge
 St Mark's Basilica
 Doge's Palace
 Fondazione Musei Civici di Venezia
 Venice Biennale
 La Fenice

References

External links 
 Official Site of the City of Venice
 Fondazione Musei Civici di Venezia (Italian/English)

2021 in Italy
History of Venice
Anniversaries of cities
March 2021 events in Italy